The National Tramway Museum (trading as Crich Tramway Village) is a tram museum located at Crich, Derbyshire, England. The museum contains over 60 (mainly British) trams built between 1873 and 1982 and is set within a recreated period village containing a working pub, cafe, old-style sweetshop and tram depots. The museum's collection of trams runs through the village-setting with visitors transported out into the local countryside and back. The museum is operated by the Tramway Museum Society, a registered charity.

The trams at Crich mostly ran in cities in the United Kingdom prior to the 1960s, with trams rescued (even from other countries) as the systems closed. Most of the UK tram networks, with a few exceptions closed before the 1960s. The last to close was Glasgow Corporation Tramways in 1962, a tramway well represented at the museum, leaving just the Blackpool Tramway as the sole surviving first-generation tramway. There has been a recent revival in the use of trams, with new networks opened including Tramlink, Sheffield Supertram, West Midlands Metro, Edinburgh Trams, Manchester Metrolink and the nearby Nottingham Express Transit being built and extended.

In recent years the work of the society members and the income earned from visitors has been supplemented by grants from the Heritage Lottery Fund, the Designation Challenge Fund of the Museums, Libraries and Archives Council and the DEFRA Aggregates Levy Sustainability Fund. The Crich Tramway Village remains an independent charity, which receives no funding from the state or local government and relies on the voluntary contribution made by members of the Tramway Museum Society and its visitors.

The village is also home to the Eagle Press, a small museum dedicated to letterpress printing including an 1859 Columbian printing press.

History of the museum

History of the site

George Stephenson, the great railway pioneer, had a close connection with Crich and the present (2008) tramway follows part of the mineral railway he built to link the quarry with Ambergate.

While building the North Midland Railway from Derby to Rotherham and Leeds, Stephenson had found rich coal seams in the Clay Cross area and he saw a new business opportunity. Crich was already well known for the quality of the limestone and Stephenson recognised that he could use the local coal and limestone to produce burnt lime for agricultural purposes, and then utilise the new railway to distribute it. Cliff Quarry, where Crich Tramway Village is now located, was acquired by Stephenson's company and to link the quarry with the limekilns he had built alongside the new North Midland Railway at Ambergate, Stephenson constructed a  gauge line - apparently the first metre gauge railway in the world. Stephenson was born in Wylam in Northumberland in 1781, but he lived the last 10 years of his life in Chesterfield, often bringing visitors to Crich to see the mineral railway and take refreshment in one of the village inns. He died in 1848 and is buried in Holy Trinity Church, Chesterfield. Stephenson's railway soldiered on for many years.

Tramway Museum Society
In the period after the Second World War, when most of the remaining British tramways were in decline or actually closing, the first event in the history of the National Tramway Museum took place. A group of enthusiasts on a farewell tour of Southampton Tramways in August 1948 decided to purchase one of the open top trams on which they had ridden. For the sum of £10 they purchased number 45 – now included in collection at the museum. From this purchase grew the idea of a working museum devoted to operating tramcars. From the original group developed the Tramway Museum Society, established in 1955, incorporated as a company limited by guarantee in 1962, and recognised as an educational charity in 1963.

Acquisition of the site

After a sustained search across the country, in 1959 the society's attention was drawn to the then derelict limestone quarry at Crich in Derbyshire, from which members of the Talyllyn Railway Preservation Society were recovering track from Stephenson's mineral railway for their pioneering preservation project in Wales. After a tour of the quarry, members of the society agreed to lease – and later purchase – part of the site and buildings. Over the years, by the efforts of the society members, a representative collection of tramcars was brought together and restored, tramway equipment was acquired, a working tramway was constructed and depots and workshops were built. Recognising that tramcars did not operate in limestone quarries, the society agreed in 1967 to create around the tramway the kind of streetscape through which the trams had run and thus the concept of the Crich Tramway Village was born. Members then turned their attention to collecting items of street furniture and even complete buildings, which were then adapted to house the Museum's collections of books, photographs and archives.

Timeline
1963 - First horse tram service
1964 - First electric tram service
1968 - First Grand Transport Extravaganza held, in what was to become an annual event
1969 - Opening of purpose built workshops
1975 - The Duke of Gloucester become Patron of the Society
1978 - Opening of scenic tramway to Wakebridge by Secretary of State for Employment
1982 - First phase of museum library opened
1985 - Museum loans trams to Blackpool for Electric Tram Centenary
1988 - Museum loans trams for Glasgow Garden Festival
1990 - Museum loans trams for Gateshead Garden Festival
1991 - Exhibition Hall inaugurated
1992 - Bowes-Lyon Bridge opened by Minister of State for Transport
1995 - The Secretary of State for National Heritage announces that the Museum has been included in the first 26 museums to be designated due to the outstanding nature of their collections
1997 - First AccessTram for visitors with disabilities
2002 - Opening of Workshop Viewing Gallery
2003 - Library Reading Room and Archives Store opened by the Duke of Gloucester
2004 - Woodland Walk and Sculpture Trail inaugurated by the Dowager Duchess of Devonshire
2007 - Leeds 345 wins the Best Self-Propelled Vehicle in the Heritage Railway Association Carriage & Wagon Awards, after its three-year restoration and return to service in 2004
2010 - Opening of new "Century of Trams" exhibition in main Exhibition Hall
2011 - Opening of refurbished George Stephenson Workshop, which now contains an education suite on the ground floor and a brand new exhibition on the upper floor which connects over a bridge to the Workshop Gallery
2014 - Passengers able to alight at Glory Mine for the first time

Tramcar fleet

The museum has over 60 tramcars from locations such as Berlin, Blackpool, Chesterfield, The Hague, Derby, Douglas, Dundee, Edinburgh, Gateshead, Glasgow, Grimsby, Halle, Howth, Johannesburg, Leeds, Leicester, Liverpool, London, New York, Newcastle, Oporto, Paisley, Prague, Sheffield, Southampton and Sydney. The majority of the trams at Crich are double-decker trams built between 1900 and 1930, and several have open tops. There are a few trams in the collection that were built after the Second World War, and these give an idea of how the British tram industry might have developed if services had not declined.

Every operating day, the museum selects between two and four trams and operates them over its line to Glory Mine, via Wakebridge. In addition, there is a 1969 Berlin tram which has been converted into an "Access Tram", complete with wheelchair lift, which allows visitors with disabilities to travel the line.

Southampton 45 was the very first tramcar to be preserved by the Tramway Museum Society, purchased for just £10 in 1949, after the closing ceremony of the Southampton Corporation.
The steam tram engine John Bull is rumoured to have fallen into the sea on its way from New South Wales to Manchester; it disappeared in Sydney; and re-surfaced in 1980.
Sheffield Tram No. 510, entered service in 1950 and was withdrawn, still almost brand-new, when the city's tram system closed in 1960.
When made redundant, Blackpool Tram No. 166 was commandeered by the BBC, along with its sister No. 165, as an outside broadcast unit. Many seats were removed, and cameras and recording gear were mounted, to allow the illuminations to be filmed - the already congested promenade could not take any more traffic, ruling out conventional outside broadcast units.
Prague No. 180 was transported to Crich just ahead of the "Iron curtain" of communist occupation. It became a symbol of the plight of the country. It was restored by its original manufacturers, Tatra. 
The 1904 Chesterfield tramcar No.7 survived a depot fire which destroyed many other trams and was also used as a house after withdrawal. The museum found the tram and restored it.
Leeds 345 was withdrawn early due to rotten bodywork and used as a carpenters' tea shed at a Leeds depot. It was rescued by K. Terry, and for years sat at Crich. It was moved to an outside store, where later on a fire was started. When restored, parts of the lower deck ceiling were found to be singed. It has since undergone a further overhaul and remains in service.
Sheffield 74 has been restored using parts of several different trams. The top and bottom decks are from different Sheffield trams, and the truck originates from Leeds.

London County Council 1622
London County Council 1622 was originally an open ended unrefurbished car, but was restored as an enclosed "rehab" car. Its bogies are ex Feltham.

Southampton 45

Southampton 45 was built 1903 by Hurst Nelson as an open-top double-decker tram with a 3 windowed lower saloon. At some stage it was rebuilt with canopies and 4 saloon windows by the Southampton Corporation Tramways, however the exact date is unknown.

This tram was the one that started the whole preservation movement, being bought by enthusiasts for just £10 in 1949(). However, there was no National Tramway Museum in 1949, and so the tram travelled the country staying at many locations, including Marton Depot in Blackpool, and the National Motor Museum at Beaulieu in Hampshire. Whilst it was at Beaulieu, Newcastle 102 was also there, and together they formed an open-air display, before heading to Crich in 1960.

Because it needed to pass under the medieval Bargate Arch in Southampton, the tram's proportions were altered. It also has knifeboard seating on the top deck for this reason.

Southampton 45 was withdrawn from use in September 2014, requiring an extensive overhaul.

London 106

LCCT 106 was built in April 1903, as one of 100 'B' Class Tramcars by the Electric Railway and Tramway Carriage Works, Preston, on behalf of Dick, Kerr and Company.

106 was originally an open-topped tram with reversed stairs. There were 22 seats downstairs and a further 34 upstairs. The body is of a timber construction with steel strengthening. By 1906, the reversed stairs had been altered to direct ones, and in 1911 it was rebuilt with a fully enclosed top deck. It used the conduit style of pickup, with the skate underneath the centre of the truck, in its original state, before being converted to trolley pole when it became a snow broom.

It was withdrawn from passenger service in 1925, and was converted into snowbroom No. 022 in 1927 by removing the top deck, fitting brushes under the platforms and increasing the power of the motors. It last saw active service in this state in April 1952.

After escaping the scrapyard, 106 spent many years in storage, and the London County Council Tramways Trust began its restoration in 1970, at their Bonwell Street workshop in East London. It took 13 years to return it to service, before it was launched at Crich on 15 May 1983, 80 years to the day after the opening of the London County Council electric tramway to Tooting.

It has been restored to represent one of 8 B/4 class cars with an open top and trolley mast. After over twenty years of service, 106 was withdrawn in 2007 and placed on static display. In 2013 it was moved into the workshop for an extensive overhaul. This was completed in June 2015 and the tram is now operational again.

Leeds 180

Leeds 180 was built in 1931 by Brush Electrical Machines, and is often referred to as either a Horsfield or Showboat tramcar (the latter due to the extraordinary amount of lighting on the tram).

It is currently in a red and white livery, with various advertisements, and it is currently in operational condition after an overhaul in 2009.

Leeds 399

Leeds 399 was built at Leeds Kirkstall Works, and entered service in 1925.

Leeds 399 was the second passenger tram to arrive at Crich (being superseded only by Cardiff 131 a works car, and Leeds 345), however it faced a lengthy restoration, returning only to service in 1991. It is fitted with a trolley pole, without a rope, meaning that it can use trolley reversers at the termini. It is currently in the operational pool, after undergoing remedial work to the exterior paintwork.

Leeds 602

Leeds 602 is one of three experimental tramcars built for Leeds City Tramways, the others being Leeds 600, and Leeds 601. The tramcar is the only vehicle at Crich to use VAMBAC (Variable Automatic Multinotch Braking and Acceleration Control), and one of only four in the country - two of which are at Blackpool, and the other being at the East Anglia Transport Museum.

It entered service on 1 June 1953, and was built by bus manufacturer Charles H Roe, Leeds 602 was withdrawn at the last ever "close of play" in 1957. The design of 602 owes a lot to the Glasgow Cunarders and Coronations, because the General Manager of Leeds at the time was A. B. Findlay, who did at one stage produce drawings of a single-decker Cunarder. Findlay used these ideas to build two identical prototypes (601 and 602), and Leeds 602 was fitted with VAMBAC equipment under the Bow Collector. In addition, all its fittings are electrical, making it a very complicated tram.

602's service life was spent working the Hunslet Route around Leeds - the blind for which can be seen in the picture - and it was here until the end of its working life, when it was acquired for preservation at the National Tramway Museum. Leeds 601 was also preserved, but was destroyed soon after in an arson attack.

Once at Crich it was used in service between 1967 and 1972, before its first workshop attention in 1973. It saw further use in 1974–5, and returned to the workshop in 1977. It was back in the fleet for the 1979–80 seasons, before having a third bout of workshop attention in 1986. Following this it had a longer operational life between 1987 and 1995, but it was finally withdrawn due to the discovery of a leaking roof. It was resurrected on a limited-use basis for the Tramathon in 2003, and then it was withdrawn to have attention to its leaky roof. This was finally fixed, and a long-needed repaint was undertaken. It returned for the Tramathon and Enthusiast's Day in 2005, and was used for six days in 2006. One of which was the enthusiast's day, which allowed the opportunity to ride both a bus and tram built by Charles H. Roe. The tram has not been used since, and now stands on display in the Exhibition Hall.

Liverpool 869

This tram is in a green and white livery, and is affectionately known as the Green Goddess. One of Liverpool's fleet of Bogie streamliners (there were also four-wheel versions), it was later sold on to Glasgow, from where it was bought. Fitted with EP control, is often used for UDEs (Ultimate driving experiences, i.e. one-day tram driving courses for members of the public, equivalent to the "footplate experience" of steam railways). Following five years out of passenger carrying service, 869 was returned to working order in September 2015 following an overhaul.

Operation of the Tramway

Running line
The line starts from a stub terminus at Town End where outbound trams board, having first disembarked inbound passengers at Stephenson Place. From Town End the first  of line takes the form of a double track, laid in a setted street, flanked by the buildings of the recreated period village, and including the inbound-only Stephenson Place tram stop. The street scene is closed off by the Bowes-Lyon Bridge, which the line crosses under on interlaced track. Just before the bridge, a junction gives access to the depot and yard.

On the far side of the bridge the line returns to double track and calls at the Victoria Park tram stop, which serves both the recreated Victorian-era public park of the same name, and the main entrance to the site from the car park.

Beyond the passing loop, the track returns to single track as far as the Glory Mine tram stop and terminus, where there is a further passing loop and a headshunt, together with a siding.

Methods of current collection
The museum's overhead wire system has been built so that trams with any type of current collection can be used. The museum currently houses trams with trolley poles, bow collectors and pantographs. The current is supplied at 600 volts DC.

Other forms used to demonstrate how current can be collected:
Conductors set in steel troughs under the roadway, as used in Blackpool, and represented in Crich with Number 4.
The stud contact system, as demonstrated with a dummy stud between the rails in the yard. This is the only known example of this form remaining, and is from Wolverhampton.

In the media

The museum features as one of the key locations in the 2012 film Sightseers.

In the opening of Women in Love.

It also features heavily in the John Shuttleworth song "Dandelion and Burdock".

The museum possesses the only remaining Mk2 police box, which formed the basis for the design of the TARDIS from Doctor Who.

See also
Listed buildings in Crich
Beamish Museum, in County Durham
Light Rail Transit Association
Maley & Taunton
Scottish Tramway and Transport Society
Summerlee Heritage Park (Coatbridge)
The Trolleybus Museum at Sandtoft, in Lincolnshire
Wirral Tramway, in Birkenhead on Merseyside

Gallery

References

External links

Official website
Topical pictures of the Museum
The London County Council Tramways Trust —- responsible for the restoration of London nos. 1, 106, 159, 1622
The Tram Centre —- all sorts of information can be found here on all types of trams
Photographs and Information from Strolling Guides
Tram Travels: Crich Tramway Village

Amber Valley
Museums in Derbyshire
Open-air museums in England
Railway museums in England
Tourist attractions of the Peak District
Tram museums
Tram transport in the United Kingdom
Tramways with double-decker trams
Transport museums in England